The Time To Fly Backplane SL is a Lithuanian paramotor that was designed and produced by Time to Fly of Kaunas for powered paragliding. Now out of production, when it was available the aircraft was supplied complete and ready-to-fly.

Design and development
The Backplane SL was designed to comply with the US FAR 103 Ultralight Vehicles rules as well as European regulations. It features a paraglider-style wing, single-place accommodation and a single  Simonini Mini 2 Plus engine in pusher configuration with a 2.4:1 ratio reduction drive and a  diameter three-bladed composite propeller.

As is the case with all paramotors, take-off and landing is accomplished by foot. Inflight steering is accomplished via handles that actuate the canopy brakes, creating roll and yaw.

Reviewer Rene Coulon said of the company's designs that they are "one of the best chassis designed".

Specifications (Backplane SL)

See also
Time To Fly Racket

References

Backplane
2000s Lithuanian ultralight aircraft
Single-engined pusher aircraft
Paramotors